USS LST-35 was an  of the United States Navy built during World War II. She was transferred to the Royal Hellenic Navy on 18 August 1943, before being commissioned into the USN, and was renamed Chios.

Construction 
LST-35 was laid down on 20 March 1943, at Pittsburgh, Pennsylvania, by the Dravo Corporation; launched on 30 June 1943; sponsored by Mrs. Samuel G. Cooper; and transferred to the Royal Hellenic Navy on 18 August 1943, and renamed Chios (L195).

Service history 
Chios, ex-LST-35, sailed from Galveston Bar for Key West, Florida, on 28 August 1943, with convoy HK 125, arriving in Key West, 1 September 1943.

On 11 October 1943, Chios left Halifax, Nova Scotia, in convoy SC 144, en route she joined convoy WN 497 that had departed Loch Ewe, on 26 October. She arrived in Methil, Scotland, on 28 October with a load of lumber.

Chios departed Methil, on 3 December 1943, in convoy EN 314 (series 2), arriving in Loch Ewe, on 5 December. She departed Liverpool, England, in convoy OS 63/KMS 37, on 25 December 1943. The convoy split on 7 January 1944, with Chios continuing on in convoy KMS 37G, arriving in Gibraltar, on 9 January. However, the same records show that she departed Liverpool, England, in convoy OS 64/KMS 38, on 3 January 1944. The convoy split on 15 January 1944, with Chios continuing on in convoy KMS 38G, arriving in Gibraltar, on 17 January. It's possible that she was delayed from sailing in the first, here intended convoy, and had to travel in the proceeding convoy.

Post-war service
She was sold to the government of Greece in January 1947. She was struck from the Navy list on 23 June 1947. She served until 1971, when she was placed in reserve. Reactivated in 1974, she was finally decommissioned from the Greek navy on 10 May 1977.

References

Bibliography

External links
 
 Χίος L-195 (1943-1977) , Hellenic Navy website

 

1943 ships
Ships built in Pittsburgh
LST-1-class tank landing ships of the Hellenic Navy
World War II amphibious warfare vessels of Greece
Ships built by Dravo Corporation